The Viscardi Center is a non-profit organization in Albertson, New York, dedicated to educating, empowering and employing people with disabilities. It was founded in 1952 by Henry Viscardi, Jr., a noted disability activist, who was also advisor to eight US Presidents on matters pertaining to disability policies. John D. Kemp is the current President of the Viscardi Center.

To provide a lifespan of services, the Viscardi Center comprises:
Abilities, Inc. for entry or reentry into the workforce for adults with disabilities through job training.
Henry Viscardi School for children with disabilities.
National business & disability council streamline adult with disabilities into businesses.
Nathaniel H. Kornreich Technology Center (KTC), a state-of-art assistive technology service provider for people with disabilities.

See also
 Henry Viscardi Achievement Awards

References

External links
 The Viscardi Center

Disability organizations based in the United States
Health and disability rights organizations in the United States
Vocational education in the United States